Rita Sahu is an Indian politician belonging to Biju Janata Dal. She was elected as a member of Odisha Legislative Assembly from Bijepur on 24 October 2019. Her husband was elected three times from Bijepur. Though her husband was an Indian National Congress politician, she is a Biju Janata Dal politician. After his death Sahu was elected as MLA of Bijepur on 28 February 2018 and served till 24 May 2019.

References

Biju Janata Dal politicians
Living people
Women members of the Odisha Legislative Assembly
Odisha MLAs 2014–2019
Odisha MLAs 2019–2024
1971 births
21st-century Indian women politicians